The Rimers of Eldritch is a play by Lanford Wilson. The play is set in the mid-20th century in Eldritch, Missouri, a decaying Bible Belt town that once was a prosperous coal mining community. The plot focuses on the murder of the aging local hermit, Skelly Mannor, by a woman, Nelly Windrod, who mistakenly thought he was committing rape when he was actually trying to prevent a rape from occurring.

Production history
The play premiered off-off-Broadway at La MaMa Experimental Theatre Club in July 1966, as directed by Wilson. The production as directed by Michael Kahn opened off-Broadway at the Cherry Lane Theatre on February 20, 1967, where it ran for 32 performances. The cast included Dena Dietrich, Don Scardino, Helen Stenborg, Susan Tyrrell, and Bette Henritze, who won the Obie Award for Distinguished Performance.

Wilson adapted his play into a television movie broadcast by PBS as the first episode of its Great Performances series on November 4, 1972. The production was directed by Davey Marlin-Jones, and stars Roberts Blossom, Susan Sarandon, Rue McClanahan, K Callan, Will Hare, Kate Harrington, Frances Sternhagen, and Ernest Thompson.

The play was revived at La MaMa in 1981 for the theater's 20th anniversary celebration. Wilson directed this production.

Mark Brokaw directed a revival at the Second Stage Theatre that opened on November 8, 1988 and ran for 43 performances. The cast included William Mesnik, Adam Storke, and Amy Ryan. Reviewing the production for The New York Times, Mel Gussow cited Wilson's "sensitivity and his gift for language."

Critical reception
Howard Thompson reviewed the television movie for The New York Times. He noted that "as a TV drama, it has a good cast, an astute director in Davey Marlin-Jones, and an authenticity of background.... the action is cluttered with a confusion of bits and pieces and even scenes that jump to the past and the future.... Mr. Marlin-Jones, with the plot edging forward, handles some scenes beautifully as in one gossipy exchange between two uneasy women, Sarah Cummingham and Helen Stenborg."

References

External links
 
The Rimers of Eldritch on La MaMa Archives Digital Collections
 
 Notes and drafts for The Rimers of Eldritch are held in the Lanford Wilson Collection at the University of Missouri Libraries

1966 plays
Off-Broadway plays
Plays by Lanford Wilson
One-act plays
Plays set in Missouri
American plays adapted into films